Breiner Alexander Paz Medina (born 27 September 1997) is a Colombian footballer who plays for Deportes Quindío.

References

Living people
1997 births
Association football defenders
Colombian footballers
Millonarios F.C. players
Categoría Primera A players
People from Valledupar
Deportes Quindío footballers